Heinz Hornig (born 28 September 1937) is a German former footballer who played as a striker.

Hornig was capped by West Germany on seven occasions, making his debut in 1965 and his final appearances the following year. He was a member of the German squad at the 1966 FIFA World Cup, although he did not play a game in the tournament.

He played his club football for 1. FC Köln between 1962 and 1970, and he appeared for them in the 1962–63 European Cup against Dundee.

References

1937 births
Living people
German footballers
Germany international footballers
FC Schalke 04 players
Rot-Weiss Essen players
1. FC Köln players
R.W.D. Molenbeek players
Bundesliga players
1966 FIFA World Cup players
German football managers
Association football forwards
Sportspeople from Gelsenkirchen
Footballers from North Rhine-Westphalia